This is a list of chess round-robin tournaments.

Major present round-robin tournaments 
 Candidates Tournament of the World Chess Championship (1950–1962, 1985, 2013–)
 Russian Chess Championship (most years)
 U.S. Chess Championship (most years)
 Beverwijk and Wijk aan Zee (Corus & Tata Steel Chess Tournament)
 Sinquefield Cup
 Dortmund Sparkassen Chess Meeting (most years)
 Biel Chess Festival (most years)
 Norway Chess
 Shamkir Chess
 Capablanca Memorial (most years)

Major historic round-robin tournaments 
 London (1862)
 Hastings (1895)
 Nuremberg (1896)
 Monte Carlo chess tournament (1901–1904, 1967–1969)
 Ostend (B) (1907)
 St. Petersburg (1909)
 San Sebastian (1911)
 Carlsbad (1911)
 Mannheim (1914)
 Carlsbad (1929)
 San Remo (1930) 
 New York (1931)
 Nottingham (1936)
 Kemeri (1937)
 AVRO tournament (1938)
 General Government (1940–1944)
 Munich (1942)
 Groningen (1946)
 World Chess Championship 1948
 Interzonal of the World Chess Championship (most years, 1948–1993)
 USSR Chess Championship (most years)
 Linares chess tournament (1981–2010)
 Reggio Emilia chess tournament
 World Chess Championship 2007
 Pearl Spring chess tournament (Nanjing, 2008)
 M-Tel Masters (Sofia)
 Tal Memorial (Moscow, 2009–2013)

 Bilbao Chess Masters Final
 Zurich Chess Challenge

Round-robin chess tournaments